is a Japanese politician of the Constitutional Democratic Party and a member of the House of Representatives in the Diet (national legislature). A native of Imaichi, Tochigi and graduate of Tohoku University, he joined the city government of Imaichi in 1971 and became the mayor of the city in 1991, serving for three terms. He was elected to be the governor of Tochigi Prefecture in 2000 but lost his re-election in 2004. In 2005, he was elected to the House of Representatives for the first time.

References

External links 
 Official website in Japanese.

Members of the House of Representatives (Japan)
Tohoku University alumni
Living people
1958 births
Constitutional Democratic Party of Japan politicians
Democratic Party of Japan politicians
Mayors of places in Tochigi Prefecture
Politicians from Tochigi Prefecture
Governors of Tochigi Prefecture
21st-century Japanese politicians